The Strangers was an Australian rock band based in Melbourne, that lasted from 1961 to 1975.  The band started out playing instrumental songs in a style similar to The Shadows, with influences from Cliff Richard.  The original line-up included Peter Robinson (bass), Graeme ('Garth') Thompson (drums), Laurie Arthur (lead guitar) and Fred Wieland (rhythm guitar).  Robinson had previously played with The Thunderbirds, and went on to replace Athol Guy in The Seekers from the late 1970s.

Founding and history
At the end of 1962 they signed with W&G Records, headed by Ron Tudor after working as the studio band for artists including The Seekers, Frankie Davidson (born 12 January 1934, Melbourne Australia) Johnny Chester, Merv Benton (born Mervyn Bonson, 12 August 1942) Little Gulliver and the Children, Pat Farrar and Joy Lemmon.  Arthur left the band in early 1964, and was replaced on lead guitar by John Farrar.

In 1964 they supported Colin Cook and released an LP called Colin Cook and the Strangers.  The first charting record in The Strangers' own name was "Cry of the Wild Goose" (an instrumental by Terry Gilkyson) / "Leavin' Town", which was released in January 1963 and reached number 12 on the Melbourne charts. This was followed by three original instrumentals, "Torlido", "The Outcast" and "Undertow", which were released in 1963, two of which reached the Top 40.  Other singles included "Happy Without You" (Kenny Laguna, Shelley Pinz, 1968), "Melanie Makes Me Smile" (Tony Macaulay, Barry Mason, 1970), "Looking Through the Eyes of a Beautiful Girl" (1970), "If You Gotta Make a Fool of Somebody" (Rudy Clark, 1965) and a cover of Five Americans, "Western Union" (Mike Rabon, Norman Ezell, John Durrill, 1967).

Also in 1964, the band supported Roy Orbison and Paul and Paula on an Australian tour which featured The Surfaris and The Beach Boys.  These support gigs influenced some early vocal recordings in "Poppa Oom Mow Mow", "Sunday Kind of Love," "If You Gotta Make a Fool of Somebody" and later "In My Room", a Beach Boys ballad.

Television band
In August 1964, The Strangers were selected as the resident backing band on the Melbourne based teenage television pop program The Go!! Show, in which they appeared each week from 1964 to 1967.  Farrar married Pat Carroll.  Carroll and Olivia Newton-John appeared on The Go!! Show as singers. After "The Go!! Show" ended, The Strangers became the resident group on HSV-7's Sunnyside Up program.  In all, the band appeared on television at least once a week for nine years straight.

During the mid-1960s, the band changed labels from W&G Records to Go Records. After the demise of the Go!! Show and its associated record label, they moved to Philips Records, and finally to Fable Records in 1970.

Replacements and collaborations
In February 1967, Terry Walker (ex Glen Ingram & The Hi-Five) replaced Fred Wieland, who left to join The Mixtures. During 1969, The Strangers' cover of "Melanie Makes Me Smile" made No. 16 in Sydney, No. 9 in Melbourne and No. 7 in Brisbane. Later singles included "Mr. President" (Trevor 'Dozy' Davies, John 'Beaky' Dymond, Ian 'Tich' Amey) in 1970, and "Sweet Water" (Fletcher/Flett), a cover of a song by obscure British band Brass Monkey, in 1971.

The group effectively broke up in mid 1970, with Farrar moving to the UK and joining Shadows members Hank Marvin and Bruce Welch in Marvin, Welch & Farrar, and then the re-formed Shadows. Later that year Robinson and Thompson reformed The Strangers (sometimes billed as The New Strangers), with guitarists John Cosgrove (ex Fendermen) and Bill Pyman. Cosgrove left in early 1973 and was replaced by Jim Sifonious (ex Dove), before the band finally broke up in 1975.

Throughout the group's 14 years, The Strangers provided backing for many local and overseas acts.  These included: Johnny Farnham, Russell Morris, Johnny Young, Neil Sedaka, Johnny O'Keefe, The Seekers, Merv Benton, Ted Mulry, Lynne Randell, Ross D. Wyllie, Yvonne Barrett, Grantley Dee, Pat Carroll, Little Gulliver, Barry Crocker, Buddy England, Ronnie Burns, Town Criers, Masters Apprentices, Axiom, Hans Poulsen and Lionel Rose.

The Strangers set an exceptional standard for live sound, using the best and "cleanest" equipment they could procure: German Dynacord microphones and public address systems, multiple guitar effects units, an exponential horn for the bass guitar, and carefully selected and matching guitars (e.g. Rickenbacker 6- and 12-string, and Maton El Toro) and amplifiers.

Farrar later moved to the USA, and wrote and produced a number of hits for Olivia Newton-John, including "Hopelessly Devoted to You", "Have You Never Been Mellow" and "Magic".

Fred Wieland, who was also a member of The Mixtures, died of lung cancer at the age of 75 on 10 December 2018.

Discography

Charting singles 

The Strangers CDs
Best of the Strangers
Bobby & Laurie
Colin Cook & the Strangers

The Strangers LP/EPs on vinyl
The Strangers
Best of the (Original) Strangers
Let's Go With the Strangers
Colin Cook and the Strangers

The Strangers cuts on vinyl (with John Farrar)

Poppa Oom Mow Mow
Sunday Kind of Love
If You Gotta Make a Fool of Somebody
Let's Go Let's Go Let's Go
In My Room
Never on a Sunday
Put Yourself in My Place
Fever
Western Union
Cool Jerk
Happy Without You
Take the Time
Lady Scorpio

California Soul
Sweet September
Paper Cup
Melanie Makes Me Smile
If You Think You're Groovy
Walkin'''Fun Fun FunStagecoachMatchboxI Call Your NameBlues by FiveBend Me Shape MeElenoreI Say a Little PrayerWill You Still Love Me TomorrowI Can Hear MusicPaperback WriterLittle Deuce CoupeLittle St. NickStanding in the Shadows of LoveI've Got You Under My SkinProud MarySandyDo It AgainGood VibrationsWindows in Your Eyes''

References

The Strangers
a 2000 biography of The Strangers by Geoff Jermy with Peter Robinson archived at PopArchives.com.au
 (Discography)

External links
Happy Without You (1968) video at YouTube. (the song reached No. 8 nationally)

Australian pop music groups
Musical groups established in 1961
1961 establishments in Australia